William Nelson Goodwin (August 17, 1909 – December 31, 1975) was a United States district judge of the United States District Court for the Eastern District of Washington and the United States District Court for the Western District of Washington.

Education and career

Born in McKenna, Washington, Goodwin received a Bachelor of Arts degree from Washington State College in 1931 and a Bachelor of Laws from the University of Oregon School of Law in 1934. He was a salesman in Washington from 1934 to 1937, until he became a deputy prosecutor for Pierce County, Washington from 1938 to 1940. He was in private practice in Tacoma, Washington from 1940 to 1964, also serving as a United States Marine Corps Private First Class during World War II, from 1944 to 1945, and becoming a member of the Board of Regents of Washington State University from 1957 to 1975. He was the United States Attorney for the Western District of Washington from 1964 to 1966.

Federal judicial service

On March 21, 1966, Goodwin was nominated by President Lyndon B. Johnson to a new joint seat for the United States District Court for the Eastern District of Washington and United States District Court for the Western District of Washington created by 75 Stat. 80. He was confirmed by the United States Senate on April 21, 1966, and received his commission the same day. He served as Chief Judge of the Eastern District from 1972 to 1973 and as Chief Judge of the Western District from 1973 until his death on December 31, 1975, while playing tennis in Tacoma.

References

Sources
 

1909 births
1975 deaths
Judges of the United States District Court for the Western District of Washington
Judges of the United States District Court for the Eastern District of Washington
United States Attorneys for the Western District of Washington
United States district court judges appointed by Lyndon B. Johnson
20th-century American judges
United States Marine Corps personnel of World War II
United States Marines